Visionary is a 1976 studio album by guitarist Gordon Giltrap.

The music is inspired by the words of poet William Blake. Side one by the illustration "The Day of Judgement" and the poem "The Last Judgement". Side two by the poems and illustrations as titled.

Track listing
All music composed by Gordon Giltrap

Side one
"Awakening"  – 3:01
"Robes and Crowns"  – 1:23
"From The Four Winds"  – 3:30
"Lucifer's Cage"  – 4:07
"Revelation"  – 3:45

Side two
"The Price of Experience"  – 2:22
"The Dance of Albion"  – 1:57
"The Tyger"  – 2:00
"The Echoing Green"  – 2:02
"London"  – 3:01
"Night"  – 3:52

bonus tracks for Voiceprint 1999CD
"On Wings of Hope"  – 3:10
"Jerusalem"  – 3:28
"Visionary" (original version)  – 15:19

Personnel
Gordon Giltrap - guitars (Fylde 12-string acoustic, John Bailey 6-string acoustic, double neck 6- and 12-string electric)
Rod Edwards - keyboards
John G. Perry - bass
Simon Phillips - drums
with:
R.W. "Butch" Hudson - trumpet
Henry Lowther - trumpet
Chris Pyne - trombone
Chris Mercer - alto and tenor saxophone
Jeff Daly - baritone saxophone
Tony Carr - percussion
Roger Hand - percussion
Shirlie Roden - vocals
Strings led by Patrick Halling; George Hamer - contractor 
Music by Gordon Giltrap – inspired by the works of William Blake
Arranged by Rod Edwards and Roger Hand; except "From the Four Winds" arranged by Joel Lazar
Recorded between October 1975 and June 1976 at Sound Associate Studios
Engineered by Gareth Edwards
Mastered by Harry Fisher at Decca Studios

References

External links
 Gordon Giltrap
 [ Visionary]

1976 albums
Gordon Giltrap albums